Alchemy was an early protoscientific practice. It may also refer to:

Regional forms
Alchemy and chemistry in medieval Islam
Chinese alchemy
Indian alchemy, or Rasayana

Entertainment and literature
Alchemy (comics), a Marvel character
Alchemy (video game), a 2001 video game by PopCap Games
Alchemy (novel), a 2004 novel by Margaret Mahy
Doctor Alchemy, a DC Comics super-villain
Alchemy (film), 2005 film

Music

Songs 

 Alchemy, a song by Jake Kaufman and Dale North, released for the Shovel Knight DLC Plague Of Shadows

Albums
Alchemy (Leah Andreone album), 1998
Alchemy (Richard Lloyd album), 1979
Alchemy (Third Ear Band album), 1969
Alchemy (Yngwie Malmsteen album), 1999
Alchemy: An Index of Possibilities (1985), a 1985 album by David Sylvian
Alchemy: Dire Straits Live (1984)

Record labels
Alchemy Records (Japan), a record label
Alchemy Records (U.S.), a record label

Television
"Alchemy" (Eureka), an episode of Eureka
Alchemy (Fullmetal Alchemist), an ability in the Fullmetal Alchemist manga/anime series

Hardware and software
Alchemy (Adobe), Adobe software project
Alchemy (microarchitecture), a series of embedded processors originally from Alchemy Semiconductor, later owned by multiple other semiconductor companies
Sometimes used as shortcut for SQLAlchemy, an object-relational mapper for the Python programming language
AlchemyAPI, a company that uses machine learning to do natural language processing

Other
Alchemy (event), a regional Burning Man event in La Fayette, Georgia, US
Alchemy (company), a defunct film production company previously known as Millennium Entertainment

See also
Alchemist (disambiguation)
Alchemiya, a streaming service geared towards Muslims
Alchemax, a fictional corporation